Twin Method was a  nu metal band based in Liverpool, England.

History
Twin Method was formed in 2001 by Deen Dean and Jason Potticarry, who were later joined by Ioannis Lamberti. The band played some UK shows including the Medication UK Tour in 2001 and recorded an industry promotional EP.

It was announced that the band signed with Crash Music Inc. on 3 February 2006.

Music
Twin Method's debut album, The Volume of Self, was released on 13 June 2006 and produced by ex-Machine Head/Soulfly guitarist Logan Mader. The music video for the album's single, "The Abrasive", was directed by Danny Roew in Hollywood.

Twin Method toured with artists including Medication, Drowning Pool on their 2006 US tour, American Head Charge on their 2006 European Occupation Tour, SOiL, Type O Negative, Five Finger Death Punch, Bloodsimple, and in 2007 they were part of the Family Values Tour headlined by Korn and Evanescence. The group toured with Type O Negative's 2008 "Helloween Tour" along with Eurovision winner "Lordi".

Twin Method split up in early 2009 before recording their second album.

Members
 Deen Dean  - guitar, production, songwriting (2001–2009)
 Adam Carter  - drums (2003–2009)
 Ioannis Lamberti  - clean vocals, production, songwriting (2001–2009)
 Jason Potticary  - harsh/clean vocals, production (2001–2009)
 Matt Carter  - bass (2003–2009)
 Robin Carter  - programming, backing vocals (2003–2009)

Discography
Adjust Then Control (unreleased album 2003) Released 2021 through a leak
The Volume of Self (2006)

References

British industrial metal musical groups
British nu metal musical groups